In Irish political discourse, "an Irish solution to an Irish problem" is any official response to a controversial issue which is timid, half-baked, or expedient, which is an unsatisfactory compromise, or sidesteps the fundamental issue.

Earlier usage
The idea had been commonly held that Ireland's problems should be addressed by solutions developed in Ireland, rather than based on foreign models; this was sometimes expressed using some variant of the anaphora "an Irish solution to an Irish problem".  Examples of the rhetorical device include:

Eamonn Cooney said about unemployment in 1931: "There is no Irish attitude being adopted towards Irish problems. As the leader of this Party has stated, there is an Irish solution for these problems."
The president of the Irish Medical Association said of the Mother and Child Scheme in 1954: "if we want a health service we will not get it by aping the Socialists, Monarchists or Communists of other countries. We believe that there is an Irish solution to an Irish problem."
Tom O'Higgins said about health insurance in 1956: "May I express the hope that we will try more consistently to bring about an Irish solution to our own problems without seeking merely to apply here something they have done successfully or otherwise elsewhere?"
Conor Cruise O'Brien said about the Northern Ireland troubles in 1970: "Unless one can see it as an Irish quarrel, it is not possible to bring about an Irish solution for it or even to begin moving towards that."
Patrick Hillery said about EEC accession in 1971: "Different applicants have different problems. The Irish solution to the Irish problem is what we should look for. The Norwegian solution would not suit us as well as our own. Neither would the British solution."
Ajai Chopra, the head of the IMF's mission to Ireland, described the 2010 intervention of the EU-IMF-ECB troika as a lifeline that presents 'an Irish solution to Irish problems.'

The same device has been used in other countries. Sargent Shriver called the Opportunities Industrialization Center "an American solution to an American problem" in 1967; Hillary Clinton described her 1993 health care plan as "an American solution for an American problem by creating an American health care system that works for America." In 1977, Hector Laing of United Biscuits cautioned against applying its work practices at its American subsidiary Keebler Company by calling them "a British solution to a British problem."

Health (Family Planning) Act 1979

Contraception had been prohibited in the Republic of Ireland since 1935. However, the Supreme Court ruled in 1973 that married couples had a constitutional right to privacy which encompassed family planning. In 1974, Minister for Justice Patrick Cooney introduced a bill to accommodate this, but it was defeated on a free vote in which Taoiseach Liam Cosgrave was among those opposing it. Fianna Fáil came to power after the 1977 election, and Charles Haughey became Minister for Health. He introduced a bill — subsequently the Health (Family Planning) Act 1979— to allow contraceptives to be available, only by medical prescription, "for the purpose, bona fide, of family planning or for adequate medical reasons". Physicians and pharmacists who had moral objections would not be obliged to write or fill such prescriptions.

Introducing the second reading of the bill in Dáil Éireann on 28 February 1979, Haughey concluded:

Haughey was using the phrase "an Irish solution to an Irish problem" in the same approbatory sense as before. In the ensuing Dáil debate, Fianna Fáil TDs Kit Ahern and Niall Andrews quoted Haughey's description approvingly in supporting the Bill. However, liberal opponents of the 1979 Act quoted Haughey's words ironically and derisively in subsequent criticism, bringing a permanent change to the meaning of the phrase.
Noël Browne said:

Barry Desmond said:

Jim O'Keeffe said:

John Kelly said:

References

Politics of the Republic of Ireland
Political catchphrases
English phrases